Brigadier General  John E. O'Neil IV is a serving officer in the United States Army who was the 52nd Quartermaster General and commandant of the U.S. Army Quartermaster School at Fort Lee, Virginia, from 2013 to 2014.

O'Neil served as the 52nd Quartermaster General from June 14, 2013, to June 9, 2014. He currently serves as the Director for Logistics, Engineering and Security Cooperation (J4), U.S. Pacific Command, Camp H. M. Smith, Hawaii.

Awards and decorations 

  Master Parachutist Badge
  Air Assault Badge
  Parachute Rigger Badge
  Legion of Merit with oak leaf cluster
  Bronze Star Medal with oak leaf cluster
  Defense Meritorious Service Medal
  Meritorious Service Medal with six oak leaf clusters
  Army Commendation Medal with oak leaf cluster
  Army Achievement Medal with two oak leaf clusters
  National Defense Service Medal with bronze service star
  Iraq Campaign Medal with three campaign stars
  Global War on Terrorism Service Medal
  Army Service Ribbon
  Army Overseas Service Ribbon fourth award
  Korea Defense Service Medal 
  NATO Medal

References

Year of birth missing (living people)
Living people
Recipients of the Legion of Merit
Quartermasters General of the United States Army
United States Army personnel of the Iraq War
United States Army War College alumni